American singer Cassie Ventura, known simply as Cassie, has released one studio album, one mixtape, thirteen singles (including three as a featured artist) and eleven music videos. She recorded her first song, "Kiss Me", with Ryan Leslie for her mother's birthday in February 2005. Leslie then signed Ventura to his NextSelection imprint, writing and producing her first single, "Me & U", that same year. The song soon went viral after made available on her MySpace page and became a club hit in Germany. In the meantime, Diddy partnered with Leslie to release Ventura's self-titled debut album Cassie in August 2006, through Bad Boy and Atlantic Records. The album debuted at number four on the US Billboard 200 and charted within the top forty in the UK Albums Chart, where it later received a Silver certification by the British Phonographic Industry. "Me & U" peaked in the top ten of several countries, including number three on the US Billboard Hot 100 and spent seven weeks atop the US Airplay chart, being certified Platinum by the Recording Industry Association of America selling over one million digital downloads. The follow-up "Long Way 2 Go" was the final single of the album and despite less successful in the US, it went on to peak within the top forty of various other countries.

In 2007, Ventura contributed with "Is It You" to the Step Up 2: The Streets soundtrack, also starring in the film. During this time, she was featured on Leslie's single "Addiction" from his debut album. In following years, Ventura released a string of standalone singles that failed to lead a second full-length project, including "Official Girl", featuring Lil Wayne (2008), "Must Be Love", featuring Puff Daddy (2009), and "Let's Get Crazy", featuring Akon (2009), while multiple demo tracks from the project's recording sessions leaked online. In September 2011, she was featured on the Bad Boy Presents: The Preview mixtape with two new songs, "Radio", featuring Fabolous, and "Make You a Believer", featuring Jadakiss, announcing the release of a new single "King of Hearts" the following year, through Interscope Records (later included on the Bad Boy 20th Anniversary Box Set Edition). In 2012, Ventura also released a collaborative track with Nicki Minaj, "The Boys", among guest appearances with other artists, and another promotional single, "Balcony", featuring Young Jeezy, after revealing she was working on a mixtape.

In April 2013, Ventura released her debut mixtape RockaByeBaby to positive reception and critical acclaim, which was preceded by the video premieres of "Numb", featuring Rick Ross, and "Paradise", featuring Wiz Khalifa, while claiming to still be working on her sophomore album simultaneously. Later that year, she contributed with a song, "Indo", to Solange Knowles' record label compilation album Saint Heron. In September 2016, "Joint (No Sleep)" was released as a part of the Honey 3: Dare to Dance soundtrack after Ventura was cast in the film's leading role. In August 2017, she announced signing a joint deal with Epic Records and Bad Boy with the release of a single called "Love a Loser". It was followed by "Don't Play It Safe", produced by Kaytranada and was set to precede a project by the two.

In the summer of 2019, Cassie revealed through social media she would be dropping songs exclusively on streaming platforms throughout a few weeks, dubbed as Free Friday's, which formed a playlist to celebrate the launch of her new independent label Ventura Music. She stated, "#FreeFridays was an exercise in freedom that I hope you all enjoyed and will continue to enjoy."

Albums

Studio albums

Mixtapes

Singles

As lead artist

As featured artist

Promotional singles

Guest appearances

Music videos

Notes

References

Discographies of American artists
Pop music discographies
Rhythm and blues discographies